The following is a list of awards and nominations received by British actor Hugh Grant whose acting career has spanned over three decades. Besides gaining immense fame and commercial success, Grant has been bestowed with various awards and honours worldwide. He is known for giving witty and irreverent acceptance speeches.

Grant has received three British Academy Film Award nominations for his performances in the Mike Newell romantic comedy Four Weddings and a Funeral (1994), the Stephen Frears' directed biographical film Florence Foster Jenkins (2016), and the children's comedy film Paddington 2 (2017). For his work in television he received a British Academy Television Award nomination for Best Actor in a Leading Role for his performance as Jeremy Thorpe in the limited series A Very English Scandal (2018). He has also received six Golden Globe Awards nominations winning once, two Primetime Emmy Award nominations, and four Screen Actors Guild Award nominations. For his work on television he has received two Critics' Choice Television Award for Best Actor in a Limited Series or Television Movie nominations for A Very English Scandal (2018), and The Undoing (2020).

Major Associations

BAFTA Awards

Golden Globe Awards

Primetime Emmy Awards

Screen Actors Guild Awards

Miscellaneous awards

His accolades include, but are not limited to, the following:

Honorary Achievements

In 2005, Grant became one of the first 100 stars honoured at the Avenue of Stars in central London. His name is represented by a silver star set into the pavement outside St Paul's Church, known as the Actors' church, in Covent Garden Piazza.

Grant was awarded Star of the Year Award at the ShowEast Convention on 11 October 2002. Presenting the award, Sandra Bullock revealed that "on a set of hundreds of people, he knew everybody's name." Dan Fellman, Warner Bros.' president of distribution, said, "It's a great honor to have the industry pay tribute to Hugh Grant for the sheer enjoyment and delight he has brought to moviegoers worldwide during his most extraordinary career."

Sandra Bullock was once again chosen to present Grant with the prestigious Stanley Kubrick Britannia Award for Excellence in Film. The honour was bestowed on 8 November 2003 by BAFTA/LA. Grant received the award saying that it was "very very nice and unusual for me, I don't really get many prizes and when I do I'm cockahoop." BAFTA/LA chairman, Gary Dartnall, said Grant was chosen because, "His talent and keen intelligence have distinguished him as one of the best and brightest in contemporary cinema."

In 2002, Grant was declared one of the GQ Men of the Year. He was featured on the magazine's November cover with Denzel Washington and Ralph Lauren. Grant was honoured as Man of the Year in comedy for his performance in About a Boy, according to the magazine, because, "In the hands of a lesser actor, the redemption of said cad—an indolent snake who preys on single mothers—would have been a mechanical affair. Instead, About a Boy was the year's great surprise, due in part to Hugh Grant's performance—probably the finest of his career."

In 1995, after winning his Golden Globe award for Best Actor in a motion picture Comedy, according to The New York Times, Grant "made a gentle mockery of all the modest thank-you speeches at such events" and "brought down the house."

With mock gratitude, Grant said: "It's tragic how much I'm enjoying getting this. It's heaven. Right up my alley. I can't tell the Foreign Press Association how much I admire them." Referring to his agent in London, who got him the role in Four Weddings and a Funeral, he deadpanned: "He's extremely small and extremely vicious."

After the success of Four Weddings and a Funeral in 1994, Grant's wax sculpture was featured at Madame Tussauds in London. Wax figures of him are also at display in the Glamor Hall of Madame Tussauds Hong Kong, the Madame Tussauds Interactive Wax Museum in New York's Times Square, with a third one in Shanghai.

References

Lists of awards received by British actor